Lolita Go Home is an album by Jane Birkin, released in 1975. About half of the songs were written by Serge Gainsbourg (music) and Philippe Labro (words). The other half are old musical tunes. "Rien pour rien" uses the same melody as Serge Gainsbourg's "Le Cadavre Exquis" (1975).

Track listing
Music by Serge Gainsbourg, words by Philippe Labro; except where indicated
"Lolita Go Home" (3:08) 
"What Is This Thing Called Love?" (words and music: Cole Porter) - (2:28)
"Bebe Song" (2:41) 
"Where or When" (music: Richard Rodgers; words: Lorenz Hart) - (3:20)
"Si ça peut te consoler" (3:01)
"Love for Sale" (words and music: Cole Porter) - (3:41)
"Just Me and You" (2:45) 
"La fille aux claquettes" (words and music: Serge Gainsbourg) - (2:34)
"Rien pour rien" (3:06) 
"French Graffiti" (2:44)
"There's a Small Hotel" (music: Richard Rodgers; words: Lorenz Hart) - (3:05)

Personnel
Jane Birkin - vocals
Jean-Pierre Sabar - arrangements, conductor
Jean-Claude Charvier - engineer
Stephen Sahakian - assistant engineer
Francis Giacobetti - photography

Jane Birkin albums
1975 albums
Fontana Records albums